The Yamaha Fino 115 is a scooter introduced by Yamaha Motor Company Thailand in 2007. The Fino 115 has a relatively low seat height, making it popular among smaller riders, as well as an air-cooled 115 cc single-cylinder 4-stroke SOHC engine.

Little has changed about the Fino 115 since its introduction with the exception of color choices.

For the 2019 model Yamaha Fino in Indonesia, new colors are included. There are 3 types available in the Indonesia market, Fino Grande with 2 color options, Fino Premium with 3 and Fino Sporty with 3. 

The 2019 model year Yamaha Fino comes in 8 colors. 

 Fino Grande Luxury Red
 Fino Grande Royal Blue
 Fino Premium Caramel Brown
 Fino Premium Black Expresso
 Fino Premium White Latte
 Fino Sporty Retro Green
 Fino Sporty Classic Blue
 Fino Sporty Vintage Red

The 2019 New Yamaha Fino now comes with a 125 cc Blue Core Technology engine (the same engine as the Mio M3).

References 

Yamaha vehicles